Blackburn War Memorial  is located in Corporation Park in Blackburn, Lancashire, England. It was originally designed as a memorial for people who lost their lives in the First World War but was later extended to also honour those who lost their lives in the Second World War.

The main feature of this war memorial is Bertram Mackennal’s bronze sculpture known as Mother England or Sacrifice.

Plans for the memorial and Garden of Remembrance were approved by the Blackburn War Memorial Committee in October 1922 and it was unveiled on 2 August 1924.

Gallery

References

External links

 Images
 Garden of Remembrance, antique photo
 Garden of Remembrance c1955, Blackburn
 Bertram Mackenna, creator of the memorial
National Archives website article covering some of Bertram Mackennal’s work
Details of Mackennal on "The Victorian Web" website.

British military memorials and cemeteries
War Memorial
Bronze sculptures in the United Kingdom
1924 sculptures
War Memorial
World War I memorials in England
World War II memorials in England